A Conversation is a play by the Australian author David Williamson. It was the second in his "Jack Manning trilogy" of plays about conferencing.

References

Plays by David Williamson
2001 plays